Yun County or Yunxian is a county in the west of Yunnan province, China. It is the easternmost county-level division of the prefecture-level city of Lincang.

Administrative divisions
Yun County has 7 towns, 2 townships and 3 ethnic townships. 
7 towns

2 townships
 Xiaojie
 Chafang
3 ethnic townships
 Manghuai Yi and Bulang
 Lishu Yi and Dai
 Houqing Yi

Ethnic groups

According to the Yun County Gazetteer (2006:527), the Limi, a Yi subgroup, and Dai, both located in Xingfu Township, preserve both their traditional clothing and language. However, the following peoples preserve their language, but not their traditional clothing.

Xiangtang 香堂: Xinmin 新民, Dazhai Township 大寨镇
Tuli 土里: Shaojie 哨街 and Houshan 后山 of Maolan Township 茂兰镇
Luoluo 倮倮: Hewai 河外, Aihua Township 爱华镇

Transportation 
China National Highway 214

Climate

References

External links
Yun County Official Site

County-level divisions of Lincang